Southern Aeronautical Corporation was an American aircraft manufacturer, founded by Charles Lasher and based in Miami Lakes, Florida. The company specialized in the design of Formula V Air Racing aircraft for amateur construction.

The company was formed as a Florida Domestic for Profit Corporation on 26 January 1968 and listed Charles W. Lasher as President and Director; John W. Lasher as Treasurer and Director and Helen B. Lasher as Director and Secretary. The company status in 2013 was "inactive" as its last legal report filing was in 1981.

Aircraft

References

Defunct aircraft manufacturers of the United States
Homebuilt aircraft